Claire Morel (born 14 February 1984) is a French football striker currently playing for ES Champniers in 4th-tier Division Honneur's Centre-Ouest group. She previously played for US Compiègne, CNFE Clairefontaine, Olympique Lyonnais and ASJ Soyaux in the French First Division.

She was the championship's top scorer with 18 goals in her debut season with Olympique Lyonnais in 2004, which earned her a call-up for the French national team. As an Under-19 international she played the 2002 U-19 World Championship.

References

External links
 
 

1984 births
Living people
French women's footballers
France women's international footballers
People from Senlis
CNFE Clairefontaine players
Olympique Lyonnais Féminin players
ASJ Soyaux-Charente players
Division 1 Féminine players
Women's association football forwards
Sportspeople from Oise
Footballers from Hauts-de-France